John Hine is a Catholic bishop.

John Hine is also the name of:

John Hine (bishop of Grantham), Anglican bishop
John Hine (footballer), English footballer
John Bird Hine, New Zealand politician

See also
John Hines (disambiguation)